The 2017 African Women's Youth Handball Championship was the 13th edition of the championship organised by the Ivory Coast Handball Federation under the auspices of the African Handball Confederation. It was held in Palais des Sports de Treichville, Abidjan (Ivory Coast) from 11 to 17 September 2017. It was played in under-17 years category. It was the third time that Ivory Coast staged the competition. It also acts as qualification tournament for the IHF Women's Youth World Handball Championship. Top three teams i.e. Egypt, Tunisia and Angola qualifies for the 2018 Women's Youth World Handball Championship to be held in Poland.

Participating teams

  (Defending Champion)
 
 
 
 
 
  (Host)

Round-robin
All teams played in a round robin system.

All times are local (UTC+0).

Match results

Final standings

See also
 2017 African Women's Junior Handball Championship
 2016 African Women's Handball Championship
 2016 African Men's Youth Handball Championship

References

External links

2017 in African handball
2017 African Women's Youth Handball Championship
International handball competitions hosted by Ivory Coast
Youth
September 2017 sports events in Africa